Colonial cinema refers to the cinema produced by the colonizing nation in and about their colonies. While typically seen as a Western phenomenon, non-Western cases, most notably that of Imperial Japan, also had colonial cinemas. Colonial films typically idealized life in the colonies by emphasizing the modernizing aspects of colonization. Feature films set in colonial settings typically represented these parts of empire as refuges for colonizers looking to escape life in the metropole. As a result, colonial films frequently did not attempt to reflect the social realities of life in colonized countries. Representations of local characters, places, and customs were regularly presented as escapist, apologetic or overtly racist. Today colonial cinema is an important source to understand the mentality of the colonizing societies.

Bibliography
 
Boulanger, Pierre, Le cinéma colonial de "l'Atlantide" à "Lawrence d'Arabie", préf. de Guy Hennebelle, Paris : Seghers, 1975
Slavin, David Henry, Colonial cinema and imperial France, 1919-1939: white blind spots, male fantasies, settler myths, Baltimore : Johns Hopkins University Press,2001.

See also

 List of films featuring colonialism

Cinema
Film genres